Eşref Özmenç (30 January 1930 – 1 January 1990) was a Turkish international association football player, who most notably was a part of Beşiktaş J.K.  squad between late 1940s and 1950s. He represented Turkey at senior level, earning 8 caps between 1951 and 1954.

Career
Started his career at Istanbul-based Kadırga S.K., Özmenç joined  Beşiktaş J.K. Football Academy in 1947 and promoted to senior section following year. He earned 239 appearances for the club, scoring 9 goals across all competitions between 1948 and 1957.

Style of play and reception
According to Beşiktaş official website, Özmenç was noted a player with pace, "good" ball technique and described as a "resilient" player. He was one of 33 players listed "Centennial squad" of the club, placing himself in "bronze eleven", selected after a survey held between the official club members in 2003, centinnial year of the club.

Honours
Beşiktaş
Istanbul Football League: 1949–50, 1950–51, 1951–52, 1953–54
Turkish Federation Cup: 1956–57

Individual
Beşiktaş J.K. Squads of Century (Bronze Team)

References

External links
 
 Eşref Özmenç career stats at mackolik.com

1930 births
1990 deaths
Turkish footballers
Footballers from Istanbul
Association football defenders
Beşiktaş J.K. footballers
Vefa S.K. footballers